Mick Butler (born 27 January 1951 in Barnsley) is an English former professional footballer who made 350 appearances in the Football League playing as a striker for Barnsley, Huddersfield Town, AFC Bournemouth and Bury during the 1970s and 1980s.

References

External links
 

1951 births
Living people
Footballers from Barnsley
English footballers
Association football forwards
Worsbrough Bridge Athletic F.C. players
Barnsley F.C. players
Huddersfield Town A.F.C. players
AFC Bournemouth players
Bury F.C. players
English Football League players